Thomas Heward-Belle (born 11 March 1997) is an Australian professional association football goalkeeper who plays for Sydney FC. Heward-Belle attended the North Shore private school Barker College and played for the 1st XI there. In addition, he played for West Pymble Football Club in his junior years. Australian Goalkeeping coach Tony Franken has described Thomas to be "one of the best young goalkeepers in the world coming through".

Career
Heward-Belle was called up to the Wanderers senior squad for their 2014, and 2015 Champions League squads, and was also named in the 23-man squad for their 2014 FIFA Club World Cup campaign in Morocco, as the squads third goalkeeper.

In 2015, he left the Wanderers and signed for the Central Coast Mariners Academy. He made his professional debut for the Mariners in the A-League during the Round 12 Boxing Day fixture against Sydney FC at Allianz Stadium as a 29th-minute substitute for Paul Izzo who was sent off for a second bookable offence. Central Coast went on to lose the match 4–1. Heward-Belle conceded the penalty, even though diving the right way and managing to get a hand to the ball. He made spectacular saves but conceded a late 84th-minute goal to lose the match 4–1. He played in the 3–1 win vs Wellington Phoenix in front of a 10 000 strong home crowd.

Heward-Belle was released by the Mariners in December 2016 to focus on university studies.

International career
Heward-Belle was called up to the Young Socceroos squad by Paul Okon for a series of friendlies ahead of the 2015 FIFA U-20 World Cup, however was an unused substitute for all 3 matches. He is also eligible to play for the Canadian national team

Honours

Club
Sydney FC
A-League Premiership: 2016–17, 2017-18, 2019–20
A-League Championship: 2016-17, 2019–20
FFA Cup: 2017

References

External links

Living people
1997 births
Association football goalkeepers
Australian soccer players
Australia youth international soccer players
Australian people of Canadian descent
Western Sydney Wanderers FC players
Central Coast Mariners FC players
Sydney FC players
A-League Men players